Megalorhipida paraiso is a species of moth in the genus Megalorhipida known from Brazil. The specific name "paraiso" refers to Alto Paraiso, the locality from which the holotype specimen was collected.

References

Oxyptilini
Moths described in 2006
Endemic fauna of Brazil
Moths of South America
Taxa named by Cees Gielis